The Huba language (Nya Huba), also known as Kilba, is a Chadic language of Nigeria.

References

Biu-Mandara languages
Languages of Nigeria